Alice Keighley (born 1993) is an Australian team handball and beach handball player. As a member of the Australian national team, Alice played in the 2011 World Women's Handball Championship in Brazil and in the 2015 IHF Four Nations Tournament in Kazakhstan. As a member of the Australian Women's Junior Handball Team, she competed in the 2013 IHF Intercontinental World Cup Challenge Trophy in Mexico and the 2012 IHF Oceania Continental Challenge Trophy. In 2010, she was selected in the Australian Youth Olympic handball team to attend the 2010 Summer Youth Olympics, where the team came 6th. As a member of the Australia women's national beach handball team, she competed in the 2012 Beach Handball World Championships in Oman, the World Games 2013 in Colombia and the 2014 Beach Handball World Championships in Brazil.

References

1993 births
Living people
Australian female handball players
Handball players at the 2010 Summer Youth Olympics